The List is an upcoming Paraguayan-American thriller film directed and written by Michael J. Hardy. The film stars Fernando Abadie, Claudia Scavone, Nathan Haase, Javier Enciso, Héctor Silva, Jesús Pérez, and Eduardo Cano.

Before its premiere, the film was already declared of cultural interest in Paraguay.

Synopsis 
A wealthy exile family returns from the United States to reclaim their lives, after the fall of a brutal dictatorship. However, the new government accuses them of collaborating with the regime and the newcomers must survive a night without law. There are 12 hours that is granted to those who seek to take revenge by their own hands.

Cast
 Fernando Abadie as Juan Torres
 Claudia Scavone as Gabi Torres
 Nathan Haase as Mark
 Javier Enciso as Crazy Man
 Héctor Silva as Judge Peña
 Jesús Pérez as El General
 Eduardo Cano as Commander López

Production
The film is the first co-production between United States and Paraguay. During an interview for "La Nación" on June 2, 2020, the director Michael J. Hardy revealed that the budget was around $100,000 and commented that the plot of "The List" takes as inspiration the personal experiences of the director during the period in which he served, in different parts of the world, as an officer of the US Army and specialist in the fight against terrorism.

The principal photography began on February 25, 2020, in Asuncion, Paraguay and ended in mid-March of the same year.

Release
The film is set to release when cinemas reopen after the COVID-19 pandemic.

References

External links
 

Upcoming films
Paraguayan thriller films
Films shot in Paraguay
Films set in Paraguay
English-language films
Spanish-language American films